The 2011 Open Prévadiès Saint–Brieuc was a professional tennis tournament played on clay courts. It was the eighth edition of the tournament which was part of the 2011 ATP Challenger Tour. It took place in Saint-Brieuc, France between 28 March – 3 April 2011.

Singles main draw entrants

Seeds

 Rankings are as of March 21, 2011.

Other entrants
The following players received wildcards into the singles main draw:
  Charles-Antoine Brézac
  Nicolas Devilder
  Mathieu Rodrigues
  Ludovic Walter

The following players received entry from the qualifying draw:
  Adrian Cruciat
  Florent Diep
  Boris Pašanski
  Nicolas Renavand

Champions

Singles

 Maxime Teixeira def.  Benoît Paire, 6–3, 6–0

Doubles

 Tomasz Bednarek /  Andreas Siljeström def.  Grégoire Burquier /  Romain Jouan, 6–4, 6–7(4), [14–12]

External links
Official Website
ITF Search 
ATP official site

2011 ATP Challenger Tour
2011
2011 in French tennis
March 2011 sports events in France
April 2011 sports events in France